High Lonesome is the seventh studio album by American country music artist Randy Travis, released on August 27, 1991. Four singles were released from the album: "Forever Together" (#1 on the Billboard Hot Country Songs charts), "Better Class of Losers" (#2), "Point of Light" (#3), and "I'd Surrender All" (#20). All of these singles except "Point of Light" were co-written by Travis and Alan Jackson. Conversely, Travis co-wrote Jackson's 1992 #1 "She's Got the Rhythm (And I Got the Blues)", from his album A Lot About Livin' (And a Little 'bout Love).

Track listing

Personnel

 Russ Barenberg – acoustic guitar
 Eddie Bayers – drums
 Dennis Burnside – piano
 Larry Byrom – acoustic guitar
 Mark Casstevens – acoustic guitar
 Carol Chase – background vocals
 Jerry Douglas – dobro
 Buddy Emmons – steel guitar
 Steve Gibson – acoustic guitar, electric guitar
 Doyle Grisham – steel guitar
 Rob Hajacos – fiddle
 Sherilyn Huffman – background vocals
 David Hungate – bass guitar, emulator, trombone, trumpet
 Kyle Lehning – Wurlitzer
 Chris Leuzinger – acoustic guitar
 Paul Leim – drums
 Larrie Londin – drums
 Mac McAnally – acoustic guitar
 Terry McMillan – harmonica, percussion
 Brent Mason – six-string bass guitar, electric guitar
 Mark O'Connor – fiddle
 Hargus "Pig" Robbins – piano
 John Wesley Ryles – background vocals
 Randy Scruggs – acoustic guitar
 Lisa Silver – background vocals
 Harry Stinson – drums
 Take 6 – background vocals on "I'm Gonna Have a Little Talk with Jesus"
 Randy Travis – lead vocals
 Dianne Vanette – background vocals
 Cindy Richardson-Walker – background vocals
 Billy Joe Walker Jr. – acoustic guitar
 John Willis – acoustic guitar, electric guitar
 Dennis Wilson – background vocals
 Curtis Young – background vocals

Chart performance

Weekly charts

Year-end charts

Certifications

References

1991 albums
Randy Travis albums
Warner Records albums
Albums produced by Kyle Lehning